Roberto Cassio (born 8 January 1968) is an Italian swimmer. He competed in the men's 200 metre individual medley at the 1988 Summer Olympics.

References

External links
 

1968 births
Living people
Italian male swimmers
Olympic swimmers of Italy
Swimmers at the 1988 Summer Olympics
Swimmers from Rome
Mediterranean Games bronze medalists for Italy
Mediterranean Games medalists in swimming
Swimmers at the 1991 Mediterranean Games
Male medley swimmers